The Maharivo is a river in Menabe region of western Madagascar. It originates on the Makay Massif and flows westwards into the Indian Ocean. It is approximately 165 km long from source to sea, and drains a basin of 4,700 km2 The climate of the region is semi-arid to arid, and the upper reaches of the river are often dry for part of the year. There are manroves in the river delta. The lower portion of the river and its delta are in Kirindy Mitea National Park.

References 

Rivers of Madagascar
Rivers of Menabe